Mycalesis oroatis is a butterfly of the family Nymphalidae. It is found in South-east Asia.

Subspecies
Mycalesis oroatis oroatis (Java, Bali)
Mycalesis oroatis ustulata Distant, 1885 (southern Burma, Peninsular Malaya, Sumatra)
Mycalesis oroatis surkha Marshall, 1882 (Burma, western Thailand)

References

Butterflies described in 1864
Mycalesis
Butterflies of Java
Butterflies of Indochina
Butterflies of Indonesia
Taxa named by William Chapman Hewitson